Max Deen Larsen (6 March 1943 – 12 January 2018) founder and director of the :de:Franz-Schubert-Institut in Baden, Austria.

Biography  
Deen, son of Max and Maida Larsen, was born in Richfield, Utah. He has lived in Baden by Vienna since 1973. Larsen received his degrees in literature and philosophy at Reed College, Yale University and the Universität Wien.

He taught poetry at the Yale School of Music and at the Vienna Music Academy, history of opera at Stanford in Austria and was adjunct professor of music at the University of Alberta in Canada. He also taught at other schools and academies. Deen Larsen was the founder and director of the Franz Schubert Institute Baden.
 
Deen Larsen was buried on January 30, 2018, at the Municipal Parish Cemetery (Stadtpfarrfriedhof Baden) in Baden Austria.

External links 
 Schubert-Institut – Statement
 [https://www.meinbezirk.at/baden/lokales/erschuetterung-in-baden-ein-beliebter-lehrer-und-botschafter-badens-starb-ueberraschend-d2377486.html Erschütterung in Baden ein beliebter Lehrer und Botschafter Badens starb überraschend] – Mein Bezirk''

American music managers
1943 births
2018 deaths
University of Vienna alumni
People from Richfield, Utah
People from Baden
Reed College alumni
Yale University alumni
American expatriates in Austria
Yale University faculty